The Idel-Ural State, also known as the Volga-Ural State or Idel-Ural Republic, was a short-lived Tatar republic located in Kazan that claimed to unite Tatars, Bashkirs, Volga Germans, and the Chuvash in the turmoil of the Russian Civil War. Often viewed as an attempt to recreate the Khanate of Kazan, the republic was proclaimed on 1 March 1918, by a Congress of Muslims from Russia's interior and Siberia. Idel-Ural means "Volga-Ural" in the Tatar language.

During the Russian Revolution, various regional political leaders convened in June 1917 in Kazan. The group declared the autonomy of "Muslim Turk-Tatars of Inner Russia and Siberia". Later on, in Ufa, a parliament named the Millät Mäclese (National Council) was created, in which a draft for the creation of the state would be pushed through and accepted on 29 November 1917 following the Second All-Russia Muslim Congress. However, the Idel-Ural State was met with opposition from Zeki Velidi Togan, a Bashkir revolutionary, who declared the autonomy of Bashkiria, as well as from the Bolsheviks, who had initially supported the creation of Idel-Ural but two months after denounced it as bourgeois nationalism and declared the creation of the Tatar-Bashkir Soviet Socialist Republic, with around the same borders as Idel-Ural. This struggle between three different movements weakened the Idel-Ural State.

Members of the Tatar-Bashkir Committee of Idel-Ural based outside of Russia such as Ayaz İshaki participated in an anti-Bolshevik propaganda war. Some also joined the Prometey group, a circle of anti-Soviet Muslim intellectuals based in Warsaw. The idea of Idel-Ural by its supporting nationalists included the territory of modern-day Tatarstan, Bashkortostan, and most of Orenburg Oblast. The nationalists also wished for expansion towards the Caspian Sea. In January 1918, the Millät Mäclese adopted a constitution written by Galimzian Sharaf, Ilias and Jangir Alkin, Osman Tokumbetov and Y. Muzaffarov. The Millät Mäclese looked to declare the creation of Idel-Ural on 1 March 1918, a plan which never came to fruition due to Bolshevik arrests of members of the Millät Mäclese and their official declaration of the Tatar-Bashkir Soviet Socialist Republic.

The Republic, which in reality included only some sections of Kazan and Ufa, was defeated by the Red Army on 28 March 1918. Its parliament disbanded in April.

The president of Idel-Ural, Sadrí Maqsudí Arsal, escaped to Finland in 1918. He was well received by the Finnish foreign minister Carl Enckell, who remembered his valiant defence of the national self-determination and constitutional rights of Finland in the Russian Duma. The president-in-exile also met officials from Estonia before continuing in 1919 to Sweden, Germany and France, in a quest for Western support. Idel-Ural was listed among the "Captive Nations" in the Cold War-era public law (1959) of the United States.

See also
 Free Idel-Ural
 Idel-Ural
 Collegium for the implementation of the Idel-Ural State
 Zeki Validi Togan

Notes

External links
Tatar-Bashkir Weekly Report

Post–Russian Empire states
History of Tatarstan
Former Muslim countries in Europe
Islam in Europe
History of Kazan
Separatism in Russia
States and territories established in 1918
States and territories disestablished in 1918
1918 in Russia